The 27th Dallas–Fort Worth Film Critics Association Awards, honoring the best in film for 2021, were announced on December 20, 2021. These awards "recognizing extraordinary accomplishment in film" are presented annually by the Dallas–Fort Worth Film Critics Association (DFWFCA), based in the Dallas–Fort Worth metroplex region of Texas. The association, founded in and presenting awards since 1990, includes 30 film critics for print, radio, television, and internet publications based in North Texas. It is also committed to ensuring that their membership represents a broad range of voices, ideas and perspectives from across cultural, gender and ideological spectra.

The Power of the Dog was the DFWFCA's most awarded film of 2021, taking five honors: Best Picture, Best Director (Jane Campion), Best Actor (Benedict Cumberbatch), Best Supporting Actor (Kodi Smit-McPhee), and Best Screenplay (Campion).

Winners and nominees

Category awards
Winners are listed first and highlighted with boldface. Other films ranked by the annual poll are listed in order. While most categories saw 5 honorees named, categories ranged from as many as 10 (Best Film) to as few as 2 (Best Animated Film, Best Screenplay, Best Cinematography, and Best Musical Score).

Special award

Russell Smith Award
 Flee, for "best low-budget or cutting-edge independent film"

References

External links
 Official website

2021
2021 film awards